The Extra Man is a 2010 comedy film based on Jonathan Ames' novel of the same name. Written and directed by Shari Springer Berman and Robert Pulcini, the film stars Kevin Kline, Paul Dano, Katie Holmes, and John C. Reilly.

Plot
 
A failed playwright, Henry Harrison, develops an odd mentor relationship with Louis Ives, a troubled, cross-dressing, aspiring writer to whom Henry sublets a room in his New York apartment. Henry teaches Louis the art of being an "extra man", accompanying and entertaining wealthy older women in their fanciful social lives. Along the way, Louis encounters an environmentally conscious co-worker, Mary Powell, and a jealous, eccentric neighbor, Gershon.

Cast

Production
Filming took place in New York City between the end of February and the beginning of April 2009.

Release
The film premiered at the 2010 Sundance Film Festival and released theatrically on July 30, 2010.

Reception
On Rotten Tomatoes, the film has a 41% approval rating based on reviews from 73 critics, with an average rating of 5.5 out of 10. On Metacritic, the film has a weighted average score of 56 out of 100 based on reviews from 26 critics.

Todd McCarthy of Variety gave it a positive review and wrote: "Although too devoted to matters literary, theatrical, operatic and sexually outre to make it with general audiences, this adaptation of Jonathan Ames' novel exudes the sort of smarts and sophisticated charm specialized audiences seek."

References

External links
 
 

2010 films
2010 comedy films
American comedy films
Films directed by Shari Springer Berman and Robert Pulcini
Cross-dressing in American films
Films based on American novels
French films set in New York City
Films shot in New York City
American independent films
Films scored by Klaus Badelt
French independent films
English-language French films
3 Arts Entertainment films
2010 independent films
2010s English-language films
French comedy films
2010s American films
2010s French films
English-language comedy films